WZZE was an American Top 40 (CHR) radio station, which was located in the Philadelphia, Pennsylvania, area. The station was broadcast via a transmitter located in Glen Mills, Pennsylvania. WZZE featured a variety of disc jockeys who all had various shifts at the station itself.

The station ceased broadcasting in 2014 but did not inform the Federal Communications Commission of this until June 28, 2019, at which point its license was canceled on July 2, 2019.

References

External links

ZZE
Radio stations established in 1975
1975 establishments in Pennsylvania
Defunct radio stations in the United States
Radio stations disestablished in 2019
2019 disestablishments in Pennsylvania
ZZE